Anduhjerd Rural District is a rural district (dehestan) in Shahdad District, Kerman County, Kerman Province, Iran. At the 2006 census, its population was 915, in 226 families. The rural district has 7 villages.

References 

Rural Districts of Kerman Province
Kerman County